Tamba Kheri is a village located in Rajgarh of Churu district in the state of Rajasthan, India. As per 2011 Census of India, it has population of 1623 of which 865 are males while 758 are females.

References

Villages in Churu district